Anwar Farid Robinson (born April 21, 1979) is an American singer/songwriter/musician who was the 7th place finalist  on the fourth season of American Idol.

After moving with his family from Newark to Montclair, New Jersey in 1994, Robinson attended Montclair High School.

American Idol
In August 2004, Robinson successfully auditioned for season four of Idol in Washington, DC. He proceeded to the Top 12, but was voted off during the 1970s dance music week on April 20, 2005, after his performance of Earth Wind and Fire's "September".

He went on to tour with the Top 10 contestants of season four and sang for over 500,000 people in over 40 cities in the United States and Canada. He also participated in "Idols In Concert" at the newly built Rrazz Room at San Francisco's Hotel Nikko.

Performances on American Idol

Post-Idol
Robinson took on the role of "Collins" in the 2007–2008 national/international tour of Rent. He starred as Jesus in the Syracuse Stage production of Godspell that ran from November 25 to December 28, 2008.

He made his film debut in The Ski Trip 2: Friends and Lovers as "Owen".

On October 19, 2009, Robinson participated in a salute to Michael Jackson in "Don't Stop Til You Get Enough: Broadway Salutes The King of Pop" at New York City's legendary Birdland.

Robinson's debut album, Everything, was released on January 25, 2011.

Charity work
On March 2, 2010, Robinson joined Michelle Williams, Musiq Soulchild, Lil' Mo, Tye Tribbett, Nikki Ross & Anaysha Figueroa (both of Kirk Franklin), Nancey Jackson-Johnson, and James Hall under the executive production of Kim Burrell to record "Prayer Song" for Hope for Haiti, composed by Krishnar Lewis. In October 2010, he participated with Yolanda Adams in the  Plainfield, New Jersey event where community leaders were trying to break the Guinness World Records for the largest gospel chorus in the world.

Discography

Albums
Everything (2011)

References

External links

1979 births
American male musical theatre actors
21st-century American male actors
Singers from New Jersey
American Idol participants
American tenors
Living people
Montclair High School (New Jersey) alumni
Musicians from Newark, New Jersey
People from Montclair, New Jersey
Westminster Choir College alumni
American male pianists
21st-century American pianists
African-American pianists
21st-century African-American male singers